Robert Charles Bryan (born April 29, 1978) is an American former doubles world No. 1 tennis player. He has won twenty-three Grand Slam titles: 16 in men's doubles and 7 in mixed doubles. He turned professional in 1998. With his twin brother Mike, he was the world No. 1 doubles player for several years, first achieving the top ranking in September 2003. The brothers were named ATP Team of the Decade for 2000–2009. The brothers became the second men's doubles team to complete the Career Golden Slam at the 2012 Summer Olympics.

Bob Bryan ended his 2018 season early with subsequent hip surgery in August 2018 due to an injury he sustained during his Madrid final retirement earlier in May 2018, which would have elevated the Bryan brothers as the oldest players back to the top of the men's doubles ranking if they were victorious. His recovery from hip surgery took around 5 months, which led his brother Mike to partner with compatriots Sam Querrey and then more successfully with Jack Sock during Bob's absence.

Bob and Mike Bryan retired in August 2020. In their final two tournaments, the Bryan brothers successfully defended their title in Delray Beach, also winning the decisive rubber in a U.S. Davis Cup tie in Honolulu.

Tennis career

Doubles records
 16 Grand Slams (Open Era)
 30 Grand Slam men's doubles finals
 10-time ITF World Champions
 116 ATP Titles and 169 ATP Finals
 439 weeks at #1
 1000+ team match wins
 10 consecutive years of winning at least 1 Grand Slam
 11 time ATP Fans' Favorite Doubles Team and ATP Team of the Decade
 "Bryan Golden Slam" (only team to simultaneously hold all Grand Slam titles and an Olympic gold medal)
 7 consecutive Grand Slam finals (2005 Australian–2006 Wimbledon)
 38 Masters 1000 titles
 "Career Golden Masters" (only players in history to win all 9 Masters 1000 events)

Junior
He finished the year as the no. 1 ranked singles player in the nation in 1998 after winning the clay court nationals and reaching the finals of Kalamazoo. The brothers were back-to-back Kalamazoo doubles champions in 1995 and 1996 and won the US Open Junior doubles title in 1996.

College
He played for Stanford University in 1997 and 1998, where he helped the Cardinal win back-to-back NCAA team championships. In 1998, he won the "Triple Crown" by taking the NCAA singles, doubles (with his twin brother Mike), and team titles. He was the first man to accomplish this since Stanford's Alex O'Brien did it in 1992.

ATP Tour
With his twin brother Mike (who is the older by two minutes), Bob has won 116 doubles titles, including sixteen Grand Slam titles. In 2005, the Bryan brothers made it to the finals of all four Grand Slam tournaments, only the second time a men's doubles team has done this during the open era. In 2006, the Bryan brothers won Wimbledon and the Australian Open and completed a Career Grand Slam. Having won the 2012 US Open, they followed up by winning the first three majors of 2013, and thus held all four titles at once.  They could not complete the calendar year Grand Slam, however, as they lost in the semi-finals of the 2013 US Open.

The twins have been the year-ending top-ranked team ten times: in 2003 2005, 2006 and 2007,  and then each year from 2009 to 2014 inclusive.

The Bryan brothers have been frequent participants on U.S. Davis Cup teams. The United States sealed its 32nd title at the 2007 Davis Cup.

In the 2018 Madrid Masters 1000 final, Bob injured his hip, and the pair had to retire down 3–5 in the first set. He underwent a hip relining and made a remarkable recovery, rejoining his brother less than a year later for the 2019 Australian Open and making it to the quarterfinals. They won their first title since his surgery in February 2019 at Delray Beach.

World TeamTennis

Both brothers kicked off their World TeamTennis careers back in 1999 for the Idaho Sneakers. They went on to play for the Newport Beach Breakers in 2004, the Kansas City Explorers from 2005 to 2012, the Texas Wild in 2013, the San Diego Aviators in 2014, the California Dream in 2015, the Washington Kastles from 2016 to 2018, and most recently the Vegas Rollers in 2019. They have two World TeamTennis titles, one from the Newport Beach Breakers in 2004, and another from the Kansas City Explorers in 2010. It was announced that Bob, along with twin brother Mike, will be joining the Vegas Rollers during the 2020 WTT season set to begin July 12 at The Greenbrier.

Off-court
The Bryans guest starred on 8 Simple Rules and were on the Jan/Feb 2010 cover of Making Music Magazine. Their father, Wayne Bryan, wrote a book about his sons, The Formula: Raising Your Child to be a Champion.

Personal life
Bob Bryan married Florida attorney Michelle Alvarez in 2010; the couple have three children.

Davis Cup record (26–5)
Together with his twin brother Mike Bryan, the pair has won the most Davis Cup matches of any doubles team for the United States. Bob holds the record for most years played (14) in the Davis Cup for the U.S. He also holds a 4–2 career record in singles ties.

Grand Slam tournaments

Men's doubles: 30 (16–14)
By winning the 2006 Wimbledon title, Bryan completed the men's doubles Career Grand Slam. He became the 19th individual player and, with Mike Bryan, the 7th doubles pair to achieve this.

Mixed doubles: 9 (7–2)

Performance timelines

Doubles

Mixed doubles

References

External links
 
 
 
 Official Site
 Profile on the 60 Minutes news magazine broadcast March 21, 2010

 
1978 births
Living people
American male tennis players
Australian Open (tennis) champions
French Open champions
Identical twins
Olympic bronze medalists for the United States in tennis
People from Sunny Isles Beach, Florida
People from Camarillo, California
Stanford Cardinal men's tennis players
Tennis players at the 1999 Pan American Games
Tennis players at the 2004 Summer Olympics
Tennis players at the 2008 Summer Olympics
Tennis players at the 2012 Summer Olympics
Tennis people from California
Tennis people from Florida
US Open (tennis) champions
Wimbledon champions
US Open (tennis) junior champions
Olympic gold medalists for the United States in tennis
Pan American Games bronze medalists for the United States
Grand Slam (tennis) champions in mixed doubles
Grand Slam (tennis) champions in men's doubles
Medalists at the 2012 Summer Olympics
Medalists at the 2008 Summer Olympics
Twin sportspeople
American twins
Pan American Games medalists in tennis
Sportspeople from Ventura County, California
Grand Slam (tennis) champions in boys' doubles
Medalists at the 1999 Pan American Games
ATP number 1 ranked doubles tennis players
ITF World Champions